The American Homebuilts John Doe is an American STOL homebuilt aircraft that was designed by Steve Nusbaum and produced by American Homebuilts of Hebron, Illinois, first flown in 1994. When it was available the aircraft was supplied as a kit for amateur construction.

Design and development
The aircraft was given its name because the designer and his wife, Carla Nusbaum, could not decide on an appropriate name for the design.

The John Doe features a strut-braced high-wing, a two-seats-in-tandem enclosed cabin, fixed conventional landing gear and a single engine in tractor configuration.

The aircraft is made from welded steel tubing, with its flying surfaces covered in doped aircraft fabric. It employs a NACA 4415 airfoil.

The manufacturer estimated the construction time from the supplied kit as 400 hours.

Operational history
By 1998 the company reported that one had been completed and was flying.

By December 2007 a total of three had been completed.

In April 2015 one example was registered in the United States with the Federal Aviation Administration, although a total of three had been registered at one time.

Specifications (John Doe)

References

External links
Photo of a John Doe

John Doe
1990s United States sport aircraft
1990s United States civil utility aircraft
Single-engined tractor aircraft
High-wing aircraft
Homebuilt aircraft